Joseph Augustin "Auguste" Donny (born 1 January 1851) was a French sailor who competed in the 1900 Summer Olympics.

He was helmsman of the French boat Mignon 3, which won a bronze medal in the second race of the 2 to 3 ton class. He also participated in the Open class, but did not finish the race.

Further reading

References

External links

1851 births
Sportspeople from Béziers
French male sailors (sport)
Sailors at the 1900 Summer Olympics – 2 to 3 ton
Sailors at the 1900 Summer Olympics – Open class
Olympic sailors of France
Year of death missing
Olympic bronze medalists for France
Olympic medalists in sailing
Medalists at the 1900 Summer Olympics
Place of death missing